Zemiaki (Zamyaki) is a Nuristani language spoken by some 400–500 people in the Kunar Province of Afghanistan.

It is named after the settlement in which it is spoken, from the Pashto  "language of Zemyaki", the native equivalent being J̌amlām-am bašā. It is closely related to Waigali, and ancestors of the Zemyakis were, according to local tradition, Waigalis who migrated into the area several centuries ago. The language spoken in the surrounding areas is Pashto, and it has been a source of a large number of lexical borrowings, including several common conjunctions.

There is no grammatical gender, but number and person are marked on the verb, following a split-ergative pattern of agreement.

References

Bibliography 

Nuristani languages
Languages of Afghanistan